Stefan Romaniw  (born 12 November 1955 in Melbourne, Australia) is a Ukrainian-Australian activist currently serving as the Co-chair of the Australian Federation of Ukrainian Organisations and the First Vice President of the Ukrainian World Congress. According to historian Gregorsz Rossolinski-Liebe, he was also elected leader of the Organisation of Ukrainian Nationalists in 2009.

Romaniw was formerly the chairperson of the Victorian Multicultural Commission and Multicultural Arts and has received the Order of Australia Medal.

Romaniw was the head of the OUN-B from 2009 to December 2022, when Oleh Medunytsia was unanimously elected to replace him.

References 

Living people
1955 births
Australian people of Ukrainian descent
Australian activists
Ukrainian activists
Organization of Ukrainian Nationalists politicians